Wings of Fame is a 1990 Dutch English-language comedy fantasy film (released in the UK on 26 April 1991) directed by Otakar Votocek and starring Peter O'Toole, Colin Firth, Marie Trintignant, Andréa Ferréol and Robert Stephens. The script was written by Dutch writer Herman Koch.

Catering of the movie (that was shot partly in Amsterdam's city theater) was done by Jan (the father of Jouke Keizer) from his catering bus parked at the Leidseplein.

Cast
 Peter O'Toole as Cesar Valentin
 Colin Firth as Brian Smith
 Marie Trintignant as Bianca
 Andréa Ferréol as Theresa
 Robert Stephens as Merrick
 Ellen Umlauf as Aristida
 Maria Becker as Dr. Frisch
 Walter Gotell as Receptionist
 Gottfried John as Zlatogorski
 Michiel Romeyn as Baldesari 
 Nicolas Chagrin as Delgado
 Ken Campbell as Head Waiter

References

External links
 
 

1990 films
1990s fantasy comedy films
Dutch fantasy comedy films
1990s English-language films
English-language Dutch films
1990 comedy films